The Toronto Indoor (also known as Toronto Molson Light Challenge from 1981-1985, Corel North American Indoor in 1986 and Skydome World Tennis in 1990) was a professional men's tennis tournament played on indoor carpet courts, held at Maple Leaf Gardens. It was part of the Grand Prix tennis circuit and later, for one year, the ATP Championship Series of the ATP Tour. The tournament was established in 1972, becoming the second tournament held in Canada alongside the Canadian Open which alternated between Montreal, Quebec and Toronto, Ontario. The final event in 1990 was held at the Skydome.

It was held as an official tour event in consecutive years between 1972 and 1977, 1985 and 1986 and then again for a final time in 1990, as the first event on the newly formed ATP Tour.

From 1972 to 1977, it was part of the World Championship Tennis-tour.

From 1981-1984, the tournament was organized as an invitational round-robin event with 8 players. In 1982 two separate editions were held, at the Toronto Maple Leaf Gardens in February and at the Montreal Forum in October.

The first winner in 1972 was Rod Laver. During the second  period, Kevin Curren won the first singles event by beating Anders Järryd, with Peter Fleming and Järryd taking the doubles title. Joakim Nyström took both titles the following year with victory against Milan Šrejber in the singles and partnering Wojciech Fibak to the doubles title. After the four-year break, Ivan Lendl took the final singles title, while Patrick Galbraith and David Macpherson won the doubles.

Past finals

Key

Singles

Doubles

Notes

References

External links
 ATP Tour website

 
Grand Prix tennis circuit
ATP Tour
Sports competitions in Toronto
Carpet court tennis tournaments
Indoor tennis tournaments
Defunct tennis tournaments in Canada
Recurring sporting events established in 1971
Recurring sporting events disestablished in 1990
1971 establishments in Ontario
1990 disestablishments in Ontario
Tennis in Ontario